Crescent Star Party may refer to:

Crescent Star Party (Indonesia)
Crescent Star Party (Turkey)